The large white-faced darter or yellow-spotted whiteface (Leucorrhinia pectoralis) is a small dragonfly belonging to the genus Leucorrhinia in the family Libellulidae.

It is easily identified by the large yellow seventh segment of its abdomen.

It inhabits marshy borders and prefers less acidic waters than its close relative the white-faced darter, (Leucorrhinia dubia). It occurs from western Siberia to parts of France. From England, there was only one record in Kent in June 1859 until two sightings in May 2012 in Suffolk.

References

External links

Libellulidae
Dragonflies of Europe
Insects described in 1825